The Caucasian Shepherd Dog or Caucasian Ovcharka is a large livestock guardian dog native to the countries of the Caucasus region, notably Georgia, Armenia, Azerbaijan, and Russian republics North Ossetia and Dagestan. It was developed in the Soviet Union from about 1920 from dogs of the Caucasus Mountains and the steppe regions of Southern Russia. The Caucasus Mountains in Georgia has historically been the principal region of distribution of the Caucasian Shepherd dogs, both in terms of numbers and the quality of the dogs present in the area.

History 

For centuries dogs similar to the Caucasian mountain dogs have served shepherds in the Caucasus Mountains as livestock guardian dogs, defending sheep from predators, mainly wolves and human sheep-thieves. These dogs are distributed over a wide area, and there are considerable regional variations: those in Azerbaijan are fairly tall and lightly-built; those in Dagestan are smaller and roughly square in outline; those of the former Checheno-Ingush ASSR, now Ingushetia and Chechnya, are heavily built and very large. It is sometimes claimed that those of Georgia are better and more uniform than those of other regions.

During the twentieth century Soviet breeders selected some of these varieties among Caucasian dogs and created the Caucasian Shepherd Dog breed. Caucasian shepherds were first described by the Russian cynologist Aleksandr Mazover, noting that the center of distribution of the breed, both in terms of numbers and quality, were Georgia, Azerbaijan, Armenia and Dagestan. While the dogs from different areas of the region shared the general features today present in Caucasian shepherds, Caucasian Shepherds from Georgia were considered to be the best examples of the breed due to their size, powerful musculoskeletal structure, and attractive long hair. For this reason, Georgian SSR became a principal region of cultivation of Caucasian Shepherd Dogs in the Soviet Union.

The breed was definitively accepted by the Fédération Cynologique Internationale in 1984, under the patronage of the Soviet Union.

Characteristics 

The Caucasian Ovcharka is a large dog, usually weighing . Life expectancy is some 10–11 years.

Use 

Caucasian Shepherd Dogs served as guard dogs, bear hunting dogs and today they work as prison guard dogs in Russia.

Restrictions 

The breed is banned in Denmark and subject to restrictions in Russia.

References 

Animal breeds originating in Armenia
Animal breeds originating in Azerbaijan
Dog breeds originating in Georgia (country)
Dog breeds originating in Russia
FCI breeds
Livestock guardian dogs
Dog breeds originating in the Soviet Union